The Most is a 2000-2004 History Channel television series, hosted and narrated by Mike Rowe, and produced by Weller/Grossman Productions. The show covered many subjects and has a "Most Moment" at the end of every episode. The subjects of the series had to do with the "Most" of something. For example, the most isolated place in space (Mir), the most infamous symbol (swastika), or even the "most" largest island (Greenland). In addition, the stories were arranged into categories such as "close calls".

The Most detailed the "most" in history—the people, places, and events of the past that had significant impact when they occurred, and how they stood the test of time.

Subjects
 The Bubonic Plague
 The Great London Fire
 The Cross
 Russia
 Sovereign Military Order of Malta
 The Atomic Bombing of Hiroshima
 The Great Depression
 Hoover ball
 The Chernobyl reactor meltdown
 Flying cars
 The Mir space station
 Olympus Mons
 The Norwegian rocket incident
 NORAD
 The Swastika

Episodes

Season 1
Structures built throughout history

 Astounding Structures (3/13/00) - Temple devoted to rats; Congressional bomb shelter; weird house; largest pyramid
 Extraordinary Nations and Places (3/14/00) - Mount Everest; the Mariana Trench; tallest waterfall; longest river; smallest country; coldest place
 Incredible Disasters (3/15/00) - Volcanic eruptions; plagues; hurricanes; earthquakes; avalanches; meteors
 Remarkable Battles (3/16/00) - Glorious moments and dark hours occur during war
 Leaders; Mystery; Spies; Earth Shapers; Moon Landing (10/6/00)
 Treasure; America's Deadliest; Creatures; Hoaxes; Tiananmen Square (11/3/00)
 Criminal Duos; Treason; Proof Positive; Inventions; Lindbergh's Atlantic Crossing (11/17/00)
 On the Move; U.S. Crime Fighters; Isolation; Spoils of War (12/1/00) - Ford's landmark vehicle
 America Under Siege; Let the Games Begin; Behind Bars; The Sea (12/8/00) - Nikita Khrushchev
 Speed; Destructive Innovations; Symbols; Subterranean (12/22/00) - The Space Shuttle Challenger explosion
 Technological Catastrophes; Justice; Space Cars; Fortifications (1/5/01) - The fall of Saigon
 Close Calls; Flights of Fancy; Give & Take; Water (1/12/01) - Iranian hostage crisis
 Demolition; Oil; Nature Run Amok; Amusement (2/2/01) - Little Rock Nine
 Earth-Shattering Events; Military Embarrassments; Working; Mammoth Monuments; Pearl Harbor (3/30/01)
 Collisions; Windows Into the Past; On That Note; In the Mountains; Bastille (6/29/01) - The storming of the Bastille
 Warships; Can't Take It With You; Animal Tales; Price of Freedom; Assassination of Archduke Ferdinand (7/16/01) - burial sites
 Digging It; Light; Horse Sense; Did They ... Or Didn't They?; Science vs. Rome (8/6/01) - Rome tries Galileo
 Survival; Fire; It's Mine, All Mine; Wind; Stock Market Crash of 1929 (8/20/01)
 Wastelands; Rock Legends; Sea Stories; Temples; Sutter's Mill 1848 (9/3/01) - Gold is discovered at Sutter's Mill in 1848
 Besieged; Heavy Metal; Family Business; Venues; Battles of Lexington & Concord (9/10/01) - Sieges; large trucks; theaters; American Revolution
 Bailing Out; Rebellion; Building Blocks; Quixotic Quests (10/1/01) - Alexander Graham Bell first demonstrates electronic transmission of speech
 Armor; Remarkable Relocations; Company Towns; Prisons (10/15/01)
 Missiles; Precision; Food; Robots; Jackie Robinson (12/24/01)
 Heists; Battlefield Innovations; Destruction; Home Sweet Home; Wright Brothers' First Flight (12/24/01)

Season 2
Devastating events of the natural world

Season 4
The most glorious moments and darkest hours of war

 ?, Unknown (4/12/04)
 ?, Unknown (4/19/04)
 ?, Unknown (4/26/04)

External links
 

2000 American television series debuts
2004 American television series endings
2000s American documentary television series
History (American TV channel) original programming
English-language television shows